Paweł Orzechowski (15 December 1941 – 17 November 2016) was a Polish footballer. He played in four matches for the Poland national football team from 1964 to 1966.

References

External links
 

1941 births
2016 deaths
Polish footballers
Poland international footballers
Place of birth missing
Association footballers not categorized by position